The Seth and Elizabeth Wilson House is a historic residence located southeast of Earlham, Iowa, United States.  Seth settled with relatives in the northwestern part of Madison County in 1854.  They acquired  of land, of which Wilson himself bought .  He was a Quaker, and he encouraged other Quakers to settle in this area.  He was one of the people who developed the town of Earlham, selling the land for its establishment.

The house is an early example of a vernacular limestone farmhouse. This 1½-story structure is composed of ashlar and rubble stone.  It is one of the few symmetrically massed rectangular stone houses built in the county.  The house was listed on the National Register of Historic Places in 1987.

References

Houses completed in 1862
Vernacular architecture in Iowa
Houses in Madison County, Iowa
National Register of Historic Places in Madison County, Iowa
Houses on the National Register of Historic Places in Iowa